Drasteria cashmirensis is a moth of the family Erebidae. It is found in India (Jammu and Kaschmir, Ladakh).

References

Drasteria
Moths described in 1894
Moths of Asia